This is a list of châteaux in Limousin, France.

Corrèze 
 Château de Bity, Sarran. Owned by Jacques Chirac.
 Château La Borde, 15th century, rebuilt in 17th century, Ussel
 Château de Charlus-le-Pailhoux, Saint-Exupéry-les-Roches
 Château de Crocq, Crocq (ruined)
 Château de l'Ebraly, 15th century, Saint-Dezéry Ussel
 Château de la Gane, 15th to 16th century, Saint-Exupéry-les-Roches
 Château de la Johannie, Curemonte
 Château de Lespinasse, 15th to 17th century, La Tourette Ussel
Tours de Merle, Saint-Geniez-ô-Merle
 Château de La Mothe, 15th to 16th century, Ussel
 Château de Saint-Germain-Lavolps, Saint-Germain-Lavolps
 Châteaux de Saint-Hilaire et des Plas, Curemonte
 Châteaux Les Salles, 17th century, Ussel
 Château de Sédières, Clergoux (fortified)
 Château de Servières, 13th century, Servières-le-Château. Owned by the Abbaye d'Aurillac.
 Château Le Theil, 15th century, Ussel
 Château de Turenne, Turenne (fortified)
 Château de Ventadour, Moustier-Ventadour (ruined)

Creuse 
 Château de Boussac, Boussac
 Château de Chantemille Ahun
 Château de Crozant, Crozant
 Château d'Etangsannes, Saint-Chabrais
 Château de Jouillat Jouillat
 Château de Malval, Malval
 Château du Mazeau, Peyrat-la-Nonière
 Château de Sainte-Feyre, Sainte-Feyre
 Château de Saint-Germain-Beaupré, Saint-Germain-Beaupré
 Château du Théret La Saunière
 Château de Villemonteix Saint-Pardoux-les-Cards

Haute-Vienne 
 Château d'Aixe (or "Tour Jeanne d'Albret"), 13th century, Aixe-sur-Vienne. Demolished at the beginning of the 19th century.
 Le Chateau Conyers, Chateauponsac, constructed circa 1723, monument historic
 La salle d'Arnac, Seigneurie Arnac-la-Poste
 Château des Barthon de Montbas, 17th century, Bellac
 Château de Bagnac, 19th century, Saint-Bonnet de Bellac
 Château de la Borie, Solignac
 Domaine de La Bouchie, Aixe-sur-Vienne
 Château de Brie, Champagnac-la-Rivière (fortified)
 Château du Bucheron, Bosmie-l'Aiguille
 Château des Cars, Cars (ruined, formerly fortified) visitable
 Château de Chalucet, Saint-Jean-Ligoure (ruined, formerly fortified), visitable
 Château de Châlus-Chabrol, Châlus (ruined, formerly fortified), visitable
 Château de Châlus Maulmont, Châlus (ruined, formerly fortified), visitable
 Château du Chambon, Bersac-sur-Rivalier, 15th     to 18th century
 Château de La Chapelle, Saint-Léonard-de-Noblat
 Tour de Château-Chervix, Château-Chervix 
 Châteaux de Cloud, Ambazac
 Château de Courbefy, Bussière-Galant (ruined, formerly fortified)
 Château de Coussac-Bonneval, Coussac-Bonneval, visitable
 Manoir de La Croix du Breuil, Bessines-sur-Gartempe
 Château de Cromières, Cussac
 Château des Ducs, Mortemart
 Château des Essarts, Beaune-les-Mines
 Château d'Eyjeaux, Eyjeaux
 Château de La Faugeras, Boisseuil
 Château de Faye, Flavignac, 18th century
 Château du Fraisse, Nouic
 Château de La Garenne, Boisseuil
 Château de Gigondas, Isle
 Château de Juvet, La Roche-l'Abeille
 Château de Lage-Ponnet, Bersac-sur-Rivalier
 Château de Lastours, Rilhac-Lastours (ruined, formerly fortified), visitable
 Château de Leychoisier, Bonnac-la-Côte
 Château de Leymarie, Beynac
 Tour de Lubignac, Arnac-la-Poste
 Château de Maillofray, Blond
 Château du Mas de l'Age, Couzeix
 Château du Mazeau, Rempnat
 Château de Monismes, 13th to 15th century, Bessines-sur-Gartempe (ruined)
 Château de Montagrier, Saint-Bonnet de Bellac
 Château de Montauran, Nantiat
 Château de Montbrun, Dournazac (fortified), visitable
 Château du Monteil, Arnac-la-Poste
 Château de Montmagner, Arnac-la-Poste
 Château de Montméry, 19th century, Ambazac
 Château de Nexon, Nexon
 Château de Nieul, Nieul
 Château d'Oreix, Arnac-la-Poste
 Manoir de l'Osmonerie, 17th and 18th centuries, Aixe-sur-Vienne
 Manoir du Puy-Martin, Blanzac
 Château de Puy-Mesnil, Azat-le-Ris
 Château de Ris-Chauveron, keep 14th century, château 19th century, Azat-le-Ris
 Château de La Rivière-aux-Seigneurs, Augne
 Château de Rochechouart, Rochechouart, visitable
 Château de La Ronze, Blond
 Château de Salvanet, Saint-Priest-Taurion
 Château de Teillet, Bonnac-la-Côte
 Châteaux de Trasforêt, Ambazac
 Château de Traslage, Vicq-sur-Breuilh
 Château de Vauguenige, Saint Pardoux

Notes and references

See also
 List of castles in France

 Limousin
Limousin